Bathytoma hecatorgnia is a species of sea snail, a marine gastropod mollusk in the family Borsoniidae.

Distribution
This marine species occurs off South Australia.

References

 Verco, Joseph Cooke. Catalogue of Marine Mollusca of South Australia. Hussey and Gillingham, printers, 1908.
   Bouchet P., Kantor Yu.I., Sysoev A. & Puillandre N. (2011) A new operational classification of the Conoidea. Journal of Molluscan Studies 77: 273-308.

hecatorgnia